"Cumberland Gap" is an Appalachian folk song that likely dates to the latter half of the 19th century and was first recorded in 1924.  The song is typically played on banjo or fiddle, and well-known versions of the song include instrumental versions as well as versions with lyrics.  A version of the song appeared in the 1934 book, American Ballads and Folk Songs, by folk song collector John Lomax. Woody Guthrie recorded a version of the song at his Folkways sessions in the mid-1940s, and the song saw a resurgence in popularity with the rise of bluegrass and the American folk music revival in the 1950s.  In 1957, the British musician Lonnie Donegan had a No. 1 UK hit with a skiffle version of "Cumberland Gap".

The song's title refers to the Cumberland Gap, a mountain pass in the Appalachian Mountains at the juncture of the states of Tennessee, Virginia, and Kentucky. The gap was used in the latter half of the 18th century by westward-bound migrants travelling from the original 13 American colonies to the Trans-Appalachian frontier.  During the U.S. Civil War (1861–1865), Union and Confederate armies engaged in a year-long back-and-forth struggle for control of the gap.

Song history

Origins and early references
North Carolina songster Bascom Lamar Lunsford (1882–1973), recording his "memory collection" for the Archive of American Folk Song in March 1949, suggested that "Cumberland Gap" may be a "sped up" version of the tune that once accompanied the ballad Bonnie George Campbell.  Lunsford recorded both songs on fiddle to show the similarities (although many folk tunes from the British Isles are very similar).

One of the earliest references to "Cumberland Gap" (the song) was published by author Horace Kephart (1862–1931) in his 1913 book, Our Southern Highlanders.  Kephart recalled taking part in a bear hunt that took place circa 1904–1906 in the Great Smoky Mountains.  While waiting for weather conditions to improve, members of the hunting party sang "ballets" to pass the time.  Kephart transcribed the opening stanzas to several of these songs, including a version of "Cumberland Gap" sung by Hazel Creek bear hunter "Little John" Cable:

"L-a-a-ay down boys,
Le's take a nap:
Thar's goin' to be trouble
In the Cumberland Gap"

Kephart simply wrote that the song was of "modern and local origin."  Kentucky ballad collector H. H. Fuson published a lengthy version of "Cumberland Gap" in 1931, with the first three lines in the opening stanza reading "Lay down, boys, an' take a little nap" and the last line reading "They're all raisin' Hell in the Cumberland Gap," somewhat echoing the lyrics transcribed by Kephart a quarter-century earlier.  Fuson's version also mentions key historical events in the Cumberland Gap's pioneer period and the battle for control of the gap during the Civil War.  His last stanza ends with the line "Fourteen miles to the Cumberland Gap."  This last line would appear again in a 1933 field recording of the song by an obscure Harlan, Kentucky fiddler known as "Blind" James Howard, and published by John Lomax (who conducted the recording) in his 1934 book, American Ballads and Folk Songs.

Early recordings and performances
The earliest known recording of "Cumberland Gap" was a 1924 instrumental version by Tennessee fiddler Ambrose G. "Uncle Am" Stuart (1853–1926).  The first singing and solo banjo version was recorded by Land Norris in August, 1924 by Okeh Records. Then, in September 1924, fiddle-and-guitar duo Gid Tanner and Riley Puckett recorded the song, and would re-record the song again in 1926 with their band, the Skillet Lickers.  Tanner's lyrics bear little resemblance to Fuson's, although Tanner's chorus uses the line "Me and my wife and my wife's pap," which resembles a line in one of Fuson's stanzas.

In the mid-1940s, Woody Guthrie recorded a version of "Cumberland Gap" for Moe Asch's Folkways label, containing the chorus, "Cumberland Gap, Cumberland Gap/Seventeen miles to the Cumberland Gap" and a stanza referring to the gap's distance from Middlesboro, Kentucky.  Folk musician and folk music scholar Pete Seeger released a version somewhat similar to Guthrie's in 1954.  Donegan's 1957 skiffle version, which reached No. 1 on the charts in the United Kingdom, also resembled Guthrie's Folkways version, although his chorus uses "fifteen miles" rather than "seventeen miles."

In May 1925, at the now-legendary Fiddlers' Convention in Mountain City, Tennessee, fiddler G. B. Grayson won first prize (although accounts vary) with his rendering of "Cumberland Gap", ousting rivals Stuart, Charlie Bowman, and Fiddlin' John Carson.  Bluegrass banjoist Earl Scruggs delivered a memorable performance of "Cumberland Gap" at the Newport Folk Festival in 1959.  The song has since been recorded and performed by dozens of bluegrass, country, and folk musicians, including the 2nd South Carolina String Band's rendition of the Civil War lyrics.

Notable versions
Pre-war commercial recording details are from Rusell (2004)

Music
"Cumberland Gap" is most commonly played on fiddle, guitar or banjo.  The banjo tuning, f#BEAD, used by Dock Boggs, Hobart Smith, and Kyle Creed, is sometimes called the "Cumberland Gap tuning".  It allows banjo players to play the tune in D, the same as a fiddler would, by extending the bass range of the instrument.

The song recorded by David Rawlings is also used in the movie, The Gentlemen (2019 film).

See also
List of UK Singles Chart number ones of the 1950s

References

External links
Juneberry78s.com — Luther Strong's 1937 Library of Congress Recordings — includes a crude recording of "Cumberland Gap" by Hazard, Kentucky fiddler Luther Strong

Appalachian culture
Appalachian folk songs
Cumberland Gap
Music of East Tennessee
Woody Guthrie songs
UK Singles Chart number-one singles
Okeh Records singles